Joseph Harley "Bugs" Bennett (April 19, 1892 – November 21, 1957) was a pitcher in Major League Baseball. He played for the St. Louis Browns and Chicago White Sox.

References

External links
 

1892 births
1957 deaths
Major League Baseball pitchers
St. Louis Browns players
Chicago White Sox players
Baseball players from Kansas City, Missouri
Columbus Senators players
Oklahoma City Senators players
Mobile Sea Gulls players
Mobile Bears players
Louisville Colonels (minor league) players
Tulsa Oilers (baseball) players
Beaumont Exporters players
Dallas Steers players
Houston Buffaloes players